Pat Renella (March 24, 1929 – November 9, 2012) was an American actor. His motion picture debut was as an engineer in the space drama X-15 (1961) starring David McLean and Charles Bronson.

Renella acted in the stage play Bullfight, which opened at the Coronet Repertory Theatre on North La Cienega in West Hollywood on November 17, 1961.

Although there is not much written about him in the Los Angeles Times of the day, he was a working actor, mostly playing small parts as gangster types and hoods.

After playing an uncredited part as a man in the movie The Silencers (1966) starring Dean Martin and Stella Stevens, with Victor Buono, Renella had an uncredited small part in Riot on Sunset Strip (1967) starring Aldo Ray. He then played the role as Claude Sadi in Dayton's Devils (1968) starring Rory Calhoun, Leslie Nielsen, and Lainie Kazan. That same year, Renella played Johnny Ross, a Mafia supposed informant scheduled to testify in San Francisco, in Bullitt starring Steve McQueen, Robert Vaughn, and Jacqueline Bisset.

On television, Bert Convy played the role of Roxy in the pilot episode of the situation comedy The New Phil Silvers Show in 1963, but Renella portrayed Roxy for the rest of the show′s 1963–1964 run, appearing in eight episodes. Renella's guest appearances on television include the hit shows Route 66, Combat!, Planet of the Apes, Mannix, The High Chaparral, McCloud, The Rockford Files, The Streets of San Francisco, Hunter, The Dukes of Hazzard, and the soap opera General Hospital.

One year when he attended the Academy Awards, he went over to Ginger Rogers at a party afterward and asked her to dance. She said yes, but told him to come back when they played something slower, which he did.

Renella played the manager of the inn in the sci fi horror drama Moonchild (1974) starring Victor Buono and John Carradine, and he played Duke in Run for the Roses (1977) starring Panchito Gomez and Vera Miles.

He played a policeman in the comedy Beverly Hills Brats (1989) starring Burt Young, Martin Sheen, and Terry Moore, and was shown flubbing a line in the bloopers shown over the end credits.

Pat Renella died at age 83 at Cedars-Sinai Medical Center in Los Angeles. He is entombed in the mausoleum at Queen of Heaven Cemetery in Hillside, Illinois, a suburb of Chicago.

Filmography

References

External links

Pat Renella episode of The High Chaparral
Pat Renella page, chronicling his career, at Facebook

1929 births
2012 deaths
American male film actors
American male stage actors
American male television actors
20th-century American male actors
20th-century American singers
American baritones
American people of Italian descent
Burials in Illinois
20th-century American male singers